"I Wrote a Song" is a song by English singer and songwriter Mae Muller, who co-wrote the song with Karen Poole and Lewis Thompson. It was released as a single on 9 March 2023. The song will represent the United Kingdom in the Eurovision Song Contest 2023 after being internally selected through TaP Music and the BBC, the British broadcaster for the Eurovision Song Contest.

Muller is scheduled to perform in the second half of the Eurovision final, at position 26.

Background and release 
On 9 March 2023, Muller was announced as the UK's entry for the Eurovision Song Contest 2023 on home soil in Liverpool, during The Radio 2 Breakfast Show with Zoe Ball and studio guest Rylan Clark. Muller is the first woman to represent the UK at the contest since SuRie, in 2018. Her contest entry "I Wrote a Song" was released on the same day, accompanied by a music video which premiered on the Eurovision Song Contest's official YouTube channel. It was also released on major streaming platforms on the same day.

Muller co-wrote "I Wrote a Song" with songwriters Karen Poole and Lewis Thompson with production from Alfred Parx (L Devine). It was written in 2022, when she was going through a hard time and wanted to feel empowered about relationships. In a interview for Music Week she added:"Not to toot my own horn, but I think it's a great pop song. You can dance to it and it's also a heartbreak anthem, but it's more than that: it's about lifting yourself back up, empowering yourself, believing in your self worth and working through negative emotions to come out the other side. And I think that aligns with Eurovision."

Critical response 
"I Wrote a Song" was met with positive reviews from critics. Alexis Petridis from The Guardian gave it a three-star rating out of five, commenting that "it was better than most of our entries in previous years but failed to stand out compared to last year's entry 'Space Man'". He also drew comparisons to "Dua Lipa-esque electronic pop, underpinned by a rhythm track influenced by the sound of Robin S.’s 90s house hit 'Show Me Love', with its uptempo waltzing rhythm is also a Europop trope, reminiscent of Mediterranean holiday hits such as 'Mr. Saxobeat'."

Writing for the Daily Telegraph, James Hall described it as "a clever, sassy, precision-tooled banger" with a four-star rating out of five. He commented how "Muller sings the first verse over this before a bouncy bassline kicks in and we have a flamenco guitar-tinged middle eight that sounds like a chorus. The song is perfectly calibrated. It combines the lemon zing of revenge with a sprinkle of inner city smarts, a dollop of campness and some club ready beats." He gave praise to the organisers for picking a wise risk.

The Official Charts Company described it as "a synth-pop stomper, all about Mae funneling her anger at the betrayal of an ex-partner." They added "how it's the freshest sounding UK Eurovision entry for countless years, sounding like something that actually belongs on radio rotation and your new music playlists."

Chart performance 
In its release week, "I Wrote a Song" reached number three on the Official Big Top 40. On the UK Singles Chart, "I Wrote a Song" debuted at number 30, making it Muller's first top 40 entry as a solo artist, and her highest peaking single. It became the first Eurovision UK entry in over a decade to debut inside the Official Top 40 in its first week, since Blue in 2011 with "I Can".

Promotion 
Following the annoucement that Muller would be representing the UK in Liverpool, she appeared in a special programme later that evening on BBC One, called Eurovision 2023: Meet the UK Act, where she was interviewed by Scott Mills which was followed by the first full televisied broadcast of the song's music video. The show was watched by an audience of over 2.76 million, becoming the second most-watched television programme in the UK that day.

Eurovision Song Contest

Selection 
The British entry for the 2023 contest was internally selected by the BBC in collaboration with TaP Music. The selection process was confirmed on 8 September 2022, following the successful result for the United Kingdom at the 2022 contest. Rachel Ashdown, Commissioning Editor for the BBC, stated:

On 31 January 2023, it was reported that four acts were left in the running to represent the United Kingdom at the 2023 contest. Among the rumoured candidates were Rina Sawayama, with Radio Times stating that she would represent the UK at the 2023 contest, though this was later denied by Sawayama's management; and Mimi Webb.

On 9 March 2023, Mae Muller was announced as the chosen entrant with her song "I Wrote a Song".

At Eurovision 
The Eurovision Song Contest 2023 will take place at the Liverpool Arena in Liverpool. According to Eurovision rules, all nations with the exceptions of the host country and the "Big Five" (France, Germany, Italy, Spain and the United Kingdom) are required to qualify from one of two semi-finals in order to compete for the final; the top ten countries from each semi-final progress to the final. As such, the United Kingdom will automatically qualify to compete in the final as both the host country and a member of the "Big Five". During the semi-final allocation draw on 31 January 2023, the UK was drawn to vote in the second semi-final on 11 May 2023. On 13 March 2023, during the Heads of Delegation meeting, the UK was drawn to perform in position 26.

Both semi-finals will be broadcast on BBC One and BBC iPlayer, with the commentary team consisting of Scott Mills and Rylan Clark. This will mark the first time ever that the semi-finals will be broadcast on BBC One. The final will be broadcast on BBC One's regional variations across the UK with commentary by Mel Giedroyc and Graham Norton, the latter of whom will also co-host the show, and on BBC Radio Merseyside with commentary by Claire Sweeney alongside a member of the public, to be chosen as part of the station's "The Voice of Eurovision" talent search campaign.

Charts

References 

2023 songs
2023 singles
Eurovision songs of 2023
Eurovision songs of the United Kingdom